Go Films is a Montreal-based production shop founded in 2000, specialized in independent film.

Filmography
 2001 : Karmina 2
 2001 : Alias Betty
 2002 : Québec-Montréal
 2003 : Sur le seuil
 2004 : Love and Magnets (Les aimants)
 2005 : Dodging the Clock (Horloge biologique)
 2006 : Cheech
 2008 : Le cas Roberge
 2008 : Everything Is Fine (Tout est parfait)
 2009 : 1981
 2010 : 7 Days
 2010 : Le baiser du barbu
 2011 : Fear of Water (La peur de l'eau)
 2012 : L'Affaire Dumont
 2014 : 1987
 2015 : N.O.I.R
 2015 : Anna 
 2016 : King Dave
 2016 : Nelly

References

External links
 

Film production companies of Canada
Companies based in Montreal
Mass media companies established in 2000
2000 establishments in Canada